Ofelia Uribe de Acosta (1900 – 1988) was a Colombian suffragist.

Acosta was born on December 22, 1900, in Oiba, Santander.

In 1930, Ofelia presented at the Fourth International Conference for Women to advocate for rights for married women. Women were not allowed to vote or create contracts. Married women were under the protection of their spouses and their possessions went to their husbands.

In 1944 and 1955 respectively, she founded, edited, directed and distributed two political newspapers, the first called Agitacion Femenina (Feminist Movement) and the second called Verdad (Truth).

In 1963 she published the book Una voz insurgente (An Insurgent Voice).

Acosta died on August 4, 1988, in Bogota.

References

1900 births
1988 deaths
Colombian journalists
Colombian suffragists
Colombian women journalists
People from Santander Department
20th-century women writers
20th-century Colombian writers
20th-century journalists